"Liar"  is a song by the British rock band Queen, written by the lead singer Freddie Mercury in 1970. The song featured on the band's 1973 debut album Queen. A heavily truncated version of "Liar"  was released as a single – backed with "Doing All Right" – in the United States and New Zealand by Elektra Records in February 1974.

The music video consisted of the band miming to the song on a sound stage. "Liar" was the band's second videoclip and it was filmed one year before it was released as a single.

As confirmed by the transcription on EMI Music Publishing's Off The Record sheet music for the song, this is one of three Queen tracks, the others being "Now I'm Here" and "Under Pressure" (their collaboration originally with David Bowie), to feature a Hammond organ.

This song briefly brought up the problem of songwriting credits within the band. May queried which band members would be credited for developing the music for each song, to which Mercury concluded the discussion, stating that the lyricist, or otherwise the individual who originates the song, should be credited as its writer, a practice that continued until The Miracle (1989).

Composition 
This song makes prominent use of the flanging effect, especially on the drums and cowbell. This is also the longest song on the album.

Reception
Cash Box called it a "top flight, tightly delivered rocker" with an accent on "bass and lead guitar with energetic lead vocal and harmony performances."

Live performances

In the band's early years, "Liar" was a concert staple, performed as a conclusion to their main set, and often lasting for up to ten minutes. "Liar" would start to be played scarcely by The News of the World Tour, to be dropped from the setlist for the Jazz Tour. However, starting with the Crazy Tour, the song begins to be performed scarcely again. By the Game Tour, the song was no longer included in the setlist. The song was revived for a few shows in the European leg of the 1982 Hot Space Tour and rumoured to have been played once in the North American leg on that very same tour. The song would be revived again in the Works Tour (though the song was cut down to three minutes or less). "Liar" was referred to in the setlist of the Magic Tour, as Brian May played a partial guitar riff from the song immediately before "Tear it Up".

Personnel
Freddie Mercury – lead and backing vocals, Hammond organ
Brian May – acoustic and electric guitar, backing vocals
Roger Taylor – drums, percussion, tambourine, cowbell, backing vocals
John Deacon – bass guitar

Track listing
"Liar" (Freddie Mercury) – 3:03
"Doing All Right" (Brian May, Tim Staffell) – 4:09

Appearances
Queen (1973)
At the Beeb (1989)
Live at the Rainbow '74 (2014)
A Night at the Odeon – Hammersmith 1975 (2015)
On Air (2016)

Legacy/cover versions
Comedy heavy metal band Bad News used the opening riff and other song structures in their song "Hey, Hey, Bad News". Brian May produced their self-titled album and played on their cover of "Bohemian Rhapsody" from the same album.

Notes

External links
 
 Lyrics at Queen official website
 "Liar" at Queenpedia
 [ "Liar" song review] at Allmusic

Queen (band) songs
1973 songs
1974 singles
Songs written by Freddie Mercury
Song recordings produced by John Anthony (record producer)
Music videos directed by Bruce Gowers
EMI Records singles
Elektra Records singles
Hollywood Records singles
British hard rock songs